Three-time defending champions Dylan Alcott and Heath Davidson defeated Andy Lapthorne and David Wagner in the final, 6–2, 3–6, [10–7] to win the quad doubles wheelchair tennis title at the 2021 Australian Open.

For the first time in major history, the draw was increased from four to eight players. The wheelchair quad doubles competition, consisting of a semifinal round and a championship match, began on 15 February. It featured the same field of eight players contesting the singles competition. Two of the four pairs were seeded, with the Australian duo of Alcott and Davidson receiving the top seed and the pair of Lapthorne and Wagner getting the second seed. Both seeded pairs won their semifinal matches in straight sets; Alcott/Davidson defeated Sam Schröder/Niels Vink and Lapthorne/Wagner defeated Koji Sugeno/Nicholas Taylor. The championship match, a rematch of the 2020 final, was held on 16 February with Alcott and Davidson winning in a match tiebreaker.

Seeds

Draw

Bracket

References

External links
 Drawsheet on ausopen.com

Wheelchair Quad Doubles
2021 Quad Doubles